Jason Laycock (born 4 November 1984) is an Australian rules football player.  He played for the Essendon Football Club as a ruckman in the Australian Football League (AFL) from 2004 to 2010. He was drafted by Essendon from East Devonport Football Club with the tenth overall selection in the 2002 National AFL Draft.

Laycock was nominated for the NAB AFL Rising Star Medal in round five, 2005 before straining a calf muscle missed the last seven games of that season.  In 2006, he suffered knee and foot injuries, which restricted him to six games. Laycock played 19 games in 2007 and a further 16 games in 2008.  In 2009, he suffered another foot injury and missed the entire season.  He was delisted by Essendon in 2010.

Laycock was recruited by the Burnie Dockers Football Club in the Tasmanian Football League in 2011.

Laycock Played For The Cygnet Football Club in 2016 and the New Norfolk District Football Club In 2017 in the Southern Football League (Tasmania).

References

External links

1984 births
Living people
Essendon Football Club players
East Devonport Football Club players
Australian rules footballers from Tasmania
Tassie Mariners players
Burnie Dockers Football Club players
Bendigo Football Club players
New Norfolk Football Club players